William Malet (died 1071) held senior positions within the Norman forces that occupied England from 1066. He was appointed the second High Sheriff of Yorkshire in 1068. Of the so-called companions of William of Normandy, Malet is one of about a dozen for whom there is evidence of their presence at the Battle of Hastings of 14 October 1066. For example, the contemporary chronicler William of Poitiers recorded that Malet was present at the battle. 

According to apocryphal accounts, Malet was related to both William of Normandy and King Harold of England. Some accounts claim that Malet took charge of Harold's body  following the Norman victory at Hastings.  However, there is no evidence confirming such claims.

After 1066, he held many properties in England as well, most of them in Yorkshire and East Anglia.

Biography

Early life
According to unverifiable, apocryphal accounts, Malet had significant, multiple ties to the Anglo-Saxon elite before the Norman Conquest.

 Malet's mother was said to be English.

 He was said to be the brother of Ælgifu, wife of Ælfgar, Earl of Mercia (and, therefore, daughter-in-law of Lady Godiva).

 In or about January 1066, King Harold married Ealdgyth, often known as Edith (the dowager of Welsh king Gruffydd ap Llywelyn) and a daughter of Ælgifu and Ælfgar of Mercia.  If Malet was a biological uncle of the queen consort of England in 1066, he would probably have been pivotal to Norman-English relations at around the time of the Battle of Hastings.

Battle of Hastings
There is evidence that Malet fought on the Norman side at Hastings, regardless of any divided loyalties that may have been caused by family ties.  For instance, William of Poitiers wrote of King Harold's remains: "His corpse was brought into the Duke's camp and William [of Normandy] gave it for burial to William, surnamed Malet, and not to Harold's mother, who offered for the body of her beloved son its weight in gold." If Malet was at the Norman headquarters, immediately after the battle, it would be strong evidence that he played a significant role in the Norman victory.

High Sheriff of Yorkshire
Malet's activities during the first few years of the Norman conquest of England are not known. Early on he was granted the great honour of Eye, with vast lands in Suffolk and several other shires. It was in fact the largest lordship in East Anglia. He made Eye his caput, his main headquarters, built a motte and bailey castle there, and started a highly successful market. He is credited with initiating the urbanization of Eye.

After the Danish stronghold York was captured in 1068, he was appointed the second High Sheriff of Yorkshire. William was in charge of the garrisons defending the shire, and built a timbered castle fortress on a motte in York and another wooden castle across the River Ouse. His efforts at defending the shire from Danish raids were, in the end, a terrible failure, for the next year the city was burned and the garrison slaughtered. Malet, his wife, and two of their children were held as hostages, and finally released when the Danes were driven off.

Malet was relieved of his duties in the north, but his efforts to defend the kingdom did not go unappreciated. He stayed in the king's favour and was appointed High Sheriff of Norfolk and Suffolk about 1069/70, and appointment that passed to his son Robert upon his death.

In historical literature & the media
The Domesday Book of 1086 also mentions a Durand Malet, who held land in Lincolnshire and possibly some neighbouring shires. This may be William Malet's brother, but this is not certain.

On screen, Malet has been portrayed by Peter Halliday in the two-part BBC TV play Conquest (1966), part of the series Theatre 625, and by Gawn Grainger in the TV drama Blood Royal: William the Conqueror (1990).

Family
While still in Normandy, about 1050, William married Hesilia (Helise or Elisee), daughter of Gilbert de Brionne. Hesilia was the second cousin of William the Conqueror and possibly the widow of Balderic Teutonicus (Balderic de Courcy; Balderic de Bacqueville).
William and Hesilia had two sons and a daughter:
Robert Malet (c. 1050 – by 1130)
Gilbert Malet, founder of the Malets of Shepton Mallet in Somerset.
Beatrice.

Death
William Malet died around 1071, probably during the rebellion of Hereward the Wake.
He was succeeded by his son Robert as Lord of Eye and Sheriff of Suffolk.

References

 Ancestral Roots of Certain American Colonists Who Came to America Before 1700 by Frederick Lewis Weis, Line 234A-25
 
 
 

11th-century births
1071 deaths
Anglo-Normans
Companions of William the Conqueror
Norman warriors
People from Eye, Suffolk
High Sheriffs of Yorkshire